Colección Romántica is the compilation album of the famous Dominican songwriter and musician Juan Luis Guerra and 4.40. It was released in November 21, 2000 and February 6, 2001 in the United States by Karen Records.It is a dual album compilation including 20 of the group's classic songs remastered and re-recorded as ballads. The album also contained unaltered original versions of their softer songs, like acoustic ballads or bachatas. It would become Guerra's last album released under the Dominican independent music label Karen Records, as his later albums would be released under Vene Music and subsequently under EMI music and Capitol Latin. 

The album includes new versions of the tracks ("Tu"; "Ay Mujer" and "Razones") and live version of the song "Estrellitas y Duendes" recorded at La Plaza de Las Ventas in Madrid in 1992.Also it include, the orchestrations mesmerizing on such one-of-a-kind hits as "Bachata rosa," "Burbujas de amor, " and "Paimolita blanca." The tracks; Tu and Estrellitas y Duendes were released as promotional singles. The album sold 50,000 copies on it first week in Spain and was certified platinum (latin field) for shipping 100,000 copies in the United States. It won Tropical/salsa album of the year, group at the 2002 Billboard Latin Music Awards.

Track listing

Charts

Sales and certifications

References 

Juan Luis Guerra compilation albums
2001 greatest hits albums
Spanish-language compilation albums